Astley Village is a civil parish in the Borough of Chorley in Lancashire, England, covering a suburb of Chorley. According to the 2011 census, its population was 3,005.

History
Astley was constructed in the 1970s as a new village. The civil parish was created on 1 April 1991, prior to which the village was divided between the unparished area of Chorley and the parish of Euxton.

Community
Astley Village is best known for Astley Park, which hosted the Royal Lancashire Show for a number of years. 

Long Croft Meadow backs onto Chorley Hospital, and the main road through the village is Chancery Road. The village is bypassed via West Way (B5252), a link road opened in 1984 to take traffic off the busy Chancery Road.

References

External links

Astley Village chorley.gov.uk

Geography of Chorley
Villages in Lancashire
Civil parishes in Lancashire